Purzand-e Pain (also Romanized as Pūrzand-e Soflá, Būrzand-e Soflá, and Pūrzand-e Pā'īn) is a village in Lavasan-e Bozorg Rural District, Lavasanat District, Shemiranat County, Tehran Province, Iran. At the 2006 census, its population was 11, in 4 families.

References 

Populated places in Shemiranat County